Melvin Frithzell (born 9 August 1996) is a Swedish footballer who plays as a forward for Notodden FK.

References

 Melvin Frithzell at Elitefootball
 
 

1996 births
Living people
Swedish footballers
Swedish expatriate footballers
Landskrona BoIS players
IFK Värnamo players
Kvarnby IK players
FC Helsingør players
IK Frej players
Örgryte IS players
Superettan players
Danish Superliga players
Association football forwards
Swedish expatriate sportspeople in Denmark
Expatriate men's footballers in Denmark
IL Hødd players
Norwegian Second Division players
Notodden FK players
Swedish expatriate sportspeople in Norway
Expatriate footballers in Norway